Ulusaba Private Game Reserve, owned by Sir Richard Branson as part of the Virgin Limited Edition luxury property portfolio, consists of about 13,500 ha of land set in the heart of the Sabi Sand Private Game Reserve. This private game reserve borders on the sprawling Kruger National Park in South Africa's Mpumalanga province and is home to an abundance of wildlife. Ulusaba means fearful in the local Tsonga (Shangaan) language and it was a name given to the Sabie River by the Shangaan people. The Sabie River was originally called Ulusaba (fearful river) by the Shangaan simply because there was once a large concentration of dangerous Nile crocodile in the river. Before the establishment of the Kruger National Park, Ulusaba was once a home of Tsonga-Shangaan people, the Shangaan were evicted from this land when the Kruger National Park was established and were relocated in nearby villages adjacent Ulusaba Private Game Reserve.

One of a handful of private game lodges in the Sabi Sand area, it benefits from the recent removal of fences between private reserves and the greater Kruger National Park. This creates a much larger contiguous body of land available to wildlife in the area.

In 2007, the Nxumalo community made a land restitution claim involving 700 km² of nature reserve land. The claimants hope to settle the claim with a joint venture between Virgin Limited Edition and the newly registered Nxumalo Conservation Trust.

Wildlife 

Wildlife species include the Big five game: lion, African bush elephant, African buffalo, leopard and white rhinoceros, as well as a multitude of other mammals such as the African wild dog, giraffe, blue wildebeest, spotted hyena, hippopotamus, plains zebra, cheetah.

See also 
 Associated Private Nature Reserves

References

External links
 Ulusaba Private Game Lodge
 Ulusaba Game Reserve on Sabi Sand website

Protected areas of Mpumalanga
Virgin Limited Edition